Jaroslav Levinský and David Škoch were the defending champions, but Levinský did not participate this year.  Škoch partnered Jiří Vaněk, losing in the semifinals.

Martín García and Luis Horna won in the final 6–4, 6–4, against Fernando González and Nicolás Massú.

Seeds

Draw

Draw

External links
Draw

Dutch Open (tennis)
2005 ATP Tour
2005 Dutch Open (tennis)